Pinhal Novo is a town in Portugal situated in the Setúbal Peninsula halfway between Lisbon and Setúbal. It is a civil parish of the Palmela Municipality. The population in 2011 was 25,000, in an area of 54.44 km2. It is served by two highways connecting Lisbon to the South and by its new train station that has enabled residents to connect directly to Lisbon's subway network in 38 minutes since October 2004. It is located near the Arrabida Natural Park and many of facilities, such as shopping centers including Forum Montijo, the Alcochete Freeport, Pinô Shopping Cetre and Mochos, two of the most popular Portuguese shopping companies.

The city is experiencing continuous growth and has expanded from a little village a few years ago to a planned 40, 000 resident city. It benefits from new infrastructure, and urbanization plans do not allow large buildings, which contributes to a certain quality of life.

References

Towns in Portugal
Freguesias of Palmela